Rashad is a given name which may refer to:

Surname:
Ahmad Rashad (born 1949), American football player and sportcaster
Ali Akbar Rashad (born 1955), Iranian philosopher and Islamic scholar
Isaiah Rashad (born 1991), American rapper
Phylicia Rashad (born 1948), American actress

Given name:
Rashad Anderson (born 1983), American basketball player
Rashad Carmichael (born 1988), American football player
Rashad Coulter (born 1981), American mixed martial artist
Rashaad Coward (born 1994), American football player 
Rashad Evans (born 1979), American mixed martial arts fighter
Rashad Fenton (born 1997), American football player
Rashad Greene (born 1992), American football player
Rashad Haughton (born 1977), American writer, director, and actor
Ra'Shad James (born 1990), American basketball player
Rashad Jennings (born 1985), American football player
Rashad Johnson (born 1986), American football player
Rashad Jones-Jennings (born 1984), American basketball player
Rashad Khalifa (1935–1990), Egyptian-American biochemist
Rashad Madden (born 1992), American basketball player in the Israeli National League
Rashad McCants (born 1984), American basketball player
Rashad Moore (born 1979), American football player
Rashaad Penny (born 1996), American football player
Rashad Pharaon (1912–1990), Syrian-born Saudi Arabian medical doctor and politician
Rashad Phillips (born 1978), American basketball player
Rashad Robinson (born 1978), American civil rights leader
Rashad Ross (born 1990), American football player
Rashad Smith (disambiguation), multiple people
Rashad Vaughn (born 1996), American basketball player
Rashad Washington (born 1980), American football player
Rashad Weaver (born 1997), American football player

See also 
Rashad languages, a Sudanese language family
Rashad, Iraq, a village
Rashid (disambiguation)
Rashod

Arabic masculine given names